Carlos Thompson Durand (1924 – 4 November 1994) was a Mexican footballer. He competed in the men's tournament at the 1948 Summer Olympics.

References

External links
 
 

1924 births
1994 deaths
Mexican footballers
Mexico international footballers
Olympic footballers of Mexico
Footballers at the 1948 Summer Olympics
Footballers from Mexico City
Association football defenders
Atlante F.C. footballers